Christopher Rave (20 February 1881 – 13 January 1933) was a German painting artist, explorer of polar regions and professor.

Life 
Rave was a popular painter of naval art living in Hamburg. Between 1900 and 1909 he created about 300 paintings about 8,000 years of navigation. 1911 they were exhibited in Hamburg and sold in particular. The paintings were reproduced as postcards by two publishers, one from Hamburg, the other one from the Netherlands.

In 1910 he experienced the accident of German tall ship Preußen as a passenger, running aground close to Dover.

In 1912 he was member of German exploration voyage to Spitsbergen. His task was documentation by photographs and paintings. The voyage under the command of Herbert Schröder-Stranz and Alfred Ritscher as captain of the ship Herzog Ernst failed, and just seven out of 15 crew survived. In 1913 Rave published his experiences Tagebuch von der verunglückten Expedition Schröder-Stranz: mit Federzeichnungen vom Verfasser (Diary of the failed expedition of Schröder-Stranz).

Having cancer of the throat and hardly able to talk Rave shot himself on January 13, 1933. His tomb, designed by his student Valentin Kraus from Munich, is in Hamburg Ohlsdorf graveyard.

Paintings (selection) 

 Die brandenburgische Flotte vor Emden, Format 4.80 m × 3.50 m, property of Kunsthalle Hamburg
 SMS Seeadler, oil, before 1924, possibly several copies
 Dampfwalfangschiff im nördlichen Eismeer, oil on canvas, 60 cm × 100 cm, 1910
 T.S. "CAP ARCONA" auf See, oil on wood, 37 × 51 cm
 Altes Land im rötlichen Winterlicht, oil on canvas, 60 × 100 cm

Books 
 Tagebuch von der verunglückten Expedition Schröder-Stranz: mit Federzeichnungen vom Verfasser, Schaffstein, Köln 1913
 Illustrationen und Fotos in: Hermann Rüdiger: Die Sorge-Bai: Aus den Schicksalstagen der Schröder-Stranz-Expedition, 46 Bilder und 5 Tafeln nach Zeichnungen und photographischen Aufnahmen Christopher Rave, Reimer, Berlin 1913, Nachdruck: Edition Fines Mundi, Saarbrücken 2007

Notes

References 
 Wolfgang Kayser (Hrsg): Vom Steinzeitfloß zum Ozeanriesen (8000 Jahre Seefahrt). Das Leben und Werk des Marinemalers Christopher Rave. Selbstverlag, Hamburg 1988.

External links 
 ZDF Expedition: Fahrten ins Ungewisse: Verschollen vor Spitzbergen (Hintergrund-Informationen zur TV-Sendung vom 6. April 2008)
 Short feature about the polar expedition in German
 German NDR-TV: Lieb und teuer - presenting the painting of SMS Seeadler, Video

1881 births
1933 suicides
Explorers of the Arctic
German explorers
20th-century German painters
20th-century German male artists
German male painters
Suicides by firearm in Germany
Painters who committed suicide
German male writers